Osvaldo Coluccino (born Domodossola, 22 April 1963) is an Italian composer and poet.

Biography 
His music has been performed in some of the major festivals of classical and contemporary classical music, by prestigious soloistes, conductors, orchestras and ensembles such as Ensemble Recherche, Nieuw Ensemble and Exaudi Vocal Ensemble, and has been broadcast by national radio stations such as SWR, Radio France France Musique, ORF, Rai Radio 3, BR-Klassik, Kulturradio RBB (Rundfunk Berlin-Brandenburg), Concertzender, RTBF Musiq 3, Klara (radio station) Vlaamse Radio- en Televisieomroep VRT, RTP Rádio e Televisão de Portugal Antena 2. He has received commissions by Gran Teatro La Fenice di Venezia, Biennale di Venezia, Milano Musica, RAI National Symphony Orchestra, Transit Festival Leuven, Muziekcentrum De Bijloke Gent, Compagnia per la Musica in Roma, and others. Some of the major labels for contemporary classical music (Kairos (record label), Neos (record label), Col legno (record label)...) have released some monographic discs, while some scores are published by Rai Trade editions.

He has been engaged in an intense poetry activity from 1986 to 2003. His poems and prose have been published in his books, in prestigious literary magazines such as Il Verri and in some anthologies. Eminent linguists and literary critics have written about his poetry. He has also published artist books consisting of his poems and original works of art by renowned artists (see below in “Poetry”).

Discography 
Quale velo (2001), in [“various composers”] Crossroads, Monesis Ensemble, conductor Flavio Emilio Scogna, VDM, Rome 2008
Voce d’orlo (2004-2007), Algoritmo Ensemble, conductor Marco Angius, introduction by Paolo Petazzi, RAI Trade, Rome-Milan 2009
Neuma q (2006), electroacoustic music, Die Schachtel, Milan 2010
Gemina (2002-2008), chamber music, various performers, Due Punte, 2010
Atto (2011), music for acoustic objects, Another Timbre, Sheffield 2012
Stanze (2004-2011), Alfonso Alberti piano, Col legno (record label), Vienna 2012
String Quartets (2002-2008), Quartetto d'Archi del Teatro La Fenice (with the participation of Achille Gallo), Neos (record label), Munich 2012
Oltreorme (2012), music for acoustic objects, Another Timbre, Sheffield 2013
Parallelo (2007-2009), electroacoustic music, Unfathomless, Bruxelles 2015
Dimensioni (1997-2007), electroacoustic music, Die Schachtel, Milan 2015
Emblema (2009-2015), chamber music, Ex Novo Ensemble, Kairos (record label), Vienna 2018
Interni (2017-2018), music for flute, Roberto Fabbriciani, Kairos (record label), Vienna 2019
Absum (1999), electroacoustic music, Inexhaustible Editions, ljubljana 2021
Prima stanza (2004), in [“various composers”] Notturni, Ilaria Baldaccini piano, EMA Vinci Records, Florence 2021

Selected works

Vocal music
Nel distacco (2003), for 8 voices, on poems by Osvaldo Coluccino
Senza smuovere la brezza (2005), for 8 voices (or version for 14 voices), on poem by Osvaldo Coluccino
Il primo luogo (2006), for 4 female voices, on poem by Osvaldo Coluccino
Afea (2006), for soprano, clarinet and percussions, on poem by Osvaldo Coluccino
Scomparsa (2007), for 6 voices, on theatrical text by Osvaldo Coluccino
Eliaco (2013), for 5 voices, on poems by Osvaldo Coluccino

Orchestral music and for large ensemble
Archeo (2003-2004), for orchestra. First performance by RAI National Symphony Orchestra at Auditorium RAI in Turin
Onda, spora – Atopica (2003), for 9 instruments. RAI Trade editions, Commissioned by RAI National Symphony Orchestra
Out of the oasis (2005), for 10 strings. RAI Trade editions
Gamete stele (2007), for 9 instruments. RAI Trade ed. Commissioned by Biennale di Venezia and Compagnia per la Musica in Roma
Emblema 2 (2009-2012), for 12 instruments. Commissioned by Orchestra della Toscana, Florence
Fissità, aria (2013), for 13 instruments. Commissioned by Gli Amici di Musica/Realtà, Milan
Destato nel respiro (2018), for 14 instruments. Commissioned by Festival Angelica (with Orchestra del Teatro Comunale di Bologna), Bologna

Chamber music
Quale velo (2000-2001), for ensemble. RAI Trade editions
Aion (2002), for String Quartet. RAI Trade ed.
Diade (2002-2011), 11 duets
Stanze (2004-2011), 12 pieces for piano
Without witness (2004), for clarinet, cello and piano. RAI Trade ed.
Voce d’orlo (2006), per flute, clarinet, violin and cello. RAI Trade ed. Commissioned by Milano Musica
Attimo (2007), for String Quartet
Lasciato (2007), for violin, cello and piano. RAI Trade ed. 
Emblema (2009-2015), 6 chamber music pieces

Electroacoustic music and for acoustic objects
Dimensioni (1997-2007), 9 pieces
Absum (1999), 6 pieces
Neuma q (2006), 4 pieces
Parallelo (2007-2009), 2 pieces
Atto (2011), 5 pieces for acoustic objects
Oltreorme (2012), 4 pieces for acoustic objects

Poetry
Strumenti d’uso comune, introduction by Stefano Agosti, Campanotto, Udine 1994
Quelle volte spontanee, critical note by Giuliano Gramigna, Anterem, Verona 1996
Appuntamento, afterword by Giorgio Luzzi, original etching by Francesco Franco, Anterem, Verona, 2001
Gamete, afterword by Gilberto Isella, cover by Giulio Paolini, Coup d'Idée, Turin 2014. 
Scomparsa – tragedies in verse, Puntoacapo Editions, Pasturana 2020. 
 Artist books include Appuntamento with illustrations by Marco Gastini, design by Franco Mello, preface by Stefano Agosti, Coup d'Idée – art editions, Turin 2010; Manto with works of art by Franco Guerzoni, Rodriguez Editore, Pescara 2021; a collection of three books, i.e. Quale leggerezza with works of art by Tommaso Cascella, Essenze, assenze with works by Giulia Napoleone, Diktaion, with works of art by Bruno Ceccobelli, Rodriguez Editore, Pescara 2022; Canto del risveglio with works by Alfonso Filieri, Archivio Orolontano, Rome 2022; with the artist Giulia Napoleone he has also published the books Fontana, Edizioni Pulcinoelefante, Osnago 2022, and Una eco, Il ragazzo innocuo edition, Milan 2022

External links
Personal site

20th-century classical composers
21st-century classical composers
Italian classical composers
Italian male classical composers
1963 births
Italian composers
Italian male composers
String quartet composers
Italian poets
Italian male poets
Living people
20th-century Italian male musicians
21st-century Italian male musicians